Yandilla is a rural locality in the Toowoomba Region, Queensland, Australia. In the  Yandilla had a population of 46 people.

Geography 
The north-eastern boundary follows the Condamine River.  The area was serviced by the Millmerran railway line which stopped at Yandilla. The Gore Highway passes through from north-east to west.

History 
The locality takes its name from a pastoral run name. The name was first used in 1842 by St George Richard Gore pastoralist and politician.  The run was at first briefly known as Grass Tree Creek and there is still a creek by that name in the area. The origin of the name Yandilla is unclear. One claim is that it is a local Aboriginal word meaning running water. Another claim is that it is named after a village in Ireland as St George Gore was a brother of the 7th Baronet of Manor Gore in Donegal.

Yandilla Provisional School opened on 2 October 1882. In 1901 it was renamed Millmerran Provisional School. On 1 January 1909 it became Millmerran State School.

A second Yandilla Provisional School opened in October 1945 and closed on 1956.

In the  Yandilla had a population of 46 people.

Heritage listings
Yandilla has a number of heritage-listed sites, including:
 Gore Highway: All Saints Anglican Church, Yandilla

References

 
Towns in Queensland
Localities in Queensland